Joakim Bäckström (born 16 March 1978) is a Swedish professional golfer.

Bäckström was born in Umeå. He turned professional in 1999.

Having failed to win a place on the European Tour in 2000, Bäckström spent his early career in Sweden on the Telia Tour, where he won the 2001 Gula Sidorna Grand Open and the 2002 Sunbyholm Open. He also picked up five wins in Denmark during 2003 and 2004.

Bäckström finally joined the European Tour in 2005 after coming through the 2004 qualifying school final stage, and won the Aa St Omer Open during his rookie season. However he has struggled to establish himself after that, never finishing inside the top 100 on the Order of Merit, and lost his tour card at the end of 2008.

Professional wins (10)

European Tour wins (1)

1Dual-ranking event with the Challenge Tour

European Tour playoff record (1–0)

Nordic Golf League wins (5)

Swedish Golf Tour wins (1)

Other wins (3)
2004 Krone Golf Tour Open, Samsø Linien Pro-am, A Hereford Beefstouw Open

Team appearances
Amateur
Jacques Léglise Trophy (representing the Continent of Europe): 1995, 1996 (winners)

See also
2007 European Tour Qualifying School graduates

References

External links

Joakim Bäckström – profile at golfdata.se 

Swedish male golfers
European Tour golfers
Sportspeople from Helsingborg
1978 births
Living people